Don't Rest Your Head is a role-playing game published by Evil Hat Productions in 2006.

Description
Don't Rest Your Head is an indie role-playing game where characters who cannot sleep draw upon that insomnia for power.

Publication history
While working on Fate and Spirit of the Century, as a side-project Fred Hicks worked on indie RPG Don't Rest Your Head (2006), which would be the first published game from Evil Hat Productions. Don't Rest Your Head was critically acclaimed and quickly sold through Evil Hat's short POD print run.

Reception and legacy
Don't Rest Your Head was a runner-up for Indie Game of the Year at the 2006 Indie RPG Awards, losing to Spirit of the Century.

Shannon Appelcline commented on the game: "Don't Rest Your Head included some clever dice mechanics and some resources, all bound up in an evocative setting. People who cannot sleep draw upon that insomnia for power. As they take actions, players can choose to use madness and exhaustion dice alongside their discipline dice – but as they do so, they can go around the bend, with either insanity or nightmares catching up. Hope and despair enter the game system as coins, which players and the GM exchange with others to bend the story to their needs. When a GM uses despair he gives hope to the players and vice-versa; thus all participants in the game get to balance their  involvement in plot creation."

Jay Little, designer of the third edition of Warhammer Fantasy Roleplay (2009), listed Don’t Rest Your Head as one of his several influences for the new release.

In 2008, the game supplement Don't Lose Your Mind won the Indie RPG Awards for Indie Supplement of the Year. Don't Lose Your Mind won the Silver ENnie for Best Writing, and was also nominated for Product of the Year.

References

ENnies winners
Evil Hat Productions games
Horror role-playing games
Indie role-playing games
Role-playing games introduced in 2006